"Song of the Blind Arab" is a song written by the Azerbaijani composer Fikret Amirov for the staging of the "Sheikh Sanan" play by Huseyn Javid. It is noted that the song is a typical example of a ballad song.

History of the song 
The play Sheikh-Sanan by H. Javid is based on the well-known in Azerbaijan Arab legend. Fikret Amirov began writing the music for a dramatic performance in the 50s. This was Amirovs first appeal to the Arab theme. Almost all the music for the play Amirov created on the basis of Azerbaijani material and only in two or three cases he drew it on authentic Arabic melodies, reworking them enough. This is how the “Song of the Blind Arab”, popular outside the play, appeared.

In 1961, on the Azerbaijan Televisions studio, there was shot a video clip for the "Song of the Blind" by the stage-director Rauf Kazimovsky. The song in the video was performed by Mamedali Aliyev. The clip itself was filmed in Icheri Sheher. The song was also performed by the Peoples Artist of the USSR Rashid Behbudov. The Peoples Artist of Azerbaijan Malekkhanym Eyyubova shot a video clip for the song.

In 2007, the rapper Nado and Javid Huseyn combined Amirovs music with rap and presented this song in this genre. The song was arranged by Azad Veliyev.

In 2012, at a solemn event dedicated to the 130th anniversary of Huseyn Javid, the song was performed by the Peoples Artist of Azerbaijan Alim Gasimov.

Text

See also 
Ayrılıq
No moles left in Irevan
Şuşanın dağları başı dumanlı

References

External links 
 Song of the Blind Arab instrumental
 Song of the Blind Arab performed by Alim Gasimov
 Song of the Blind Arab performed by Mammadali Aliyev

Compositions by Fikret Amirov
1950s songs
Azerbaijani-language songs